Alan Lazar (born December 15, 1967) is a South African-born composer and novelist. He has written music for more than 50 films and TV shows, including a string of Netflix movies. He was a member of the South African band Mango Groove and is the author of the book ROAM. He became a US citizen in 2010.

Lazar has worked for the majority of his career in music. He started as a keyboard player, producer and composer for Mango Groove in the late 1980s, playing at a number of notable concerts and events over the next decade. This included the 1994 inauguration of Nelson Mandela and also played at The Freddie Mercury Tribute Concert, which was held in London. He wrote the classic South African song "African Dream", originally performed by Vicky Sampson, and in 2019 selected by America's Got Talent finalist Ndlovu Youth Choir for their debut on the show. Following his career with Mango Groove, Lazar moved to California as a Fulbright scholar, where he became involved in music production for film and television. His work has led him to work on numerous scores, including An American Crime and Gangster's Paradise: Jerusalema. His assistance in production for National Geographic's Swamp of the Baboons led to the show being nominated for a production Emmy award. He has scored a number of US TV shows including Sex and the City, Real Housewives of Beverly Hills and Real Housewives of Orange County. In 2016, he scored "Most Hated Woman In America" for Netflix, starring Melissa Leo. His second movie for Netflix was Holiday In The Wild, starring Rob Lowe and Kristin Davis, directed by Ernie Barbarash. Lazar also scored The Princess Switch: Switched Again for Netflix, starring Vanessa Hudgens and directed by Mike Rohl. Other ventures have included directing the film Purpose in 2001, which starred Mia Farrow and Paul Reiser.

Lazar is also the founder of Lalela Music, a production music library. The catalog has been used in thousands of productions globally and in 2017 was sold to STX Entertainment. 

In 2021, Lazar co-founded the Luminary Scores catalog with BMG Rights Management, producing and composing for the catalog.

His debut novel received positive reviews on its release, after finishing as runner-up at the Los Angeles Book Festival.

Early life and education
Lazar was born on 15 December 1967 in South Africa and studied at Hyde Park High School. He went on to study at Wits University before leaving his home country of South Africa, to move to the United States. Lazar moved to Los Angeles, where he went on to graduate from the USC School of Cinema Television, as a Fulbright scholar.

Career
During his years in South Africa, Lazar's early career was as a composer and musician. He joined an Afropop band while still studying in the 1980s, called Mango Groove. He played both the piano and keyboard for the band, which was one of only two music groups in South Africa at the time to have both white and black musicians, as well as composing and producing for the band.

After releasing their first studio album in the late 1980s, Mango Groove went on to become a household name in South Africa, achieving platinum record sales. They won numerous awards in the coming years, before performing at a number of global events. In 1992, Lazar performed with Mango Groove at The Freddie Mercury Tribute Concert. They performed the track, Special Star via satellite from Johannesburg, South Africa. During the same period, he also composed the track "African Dream" (performed by Vicky Sampson), which was nominated for Song of the Decade in South Africa and was known as "South Africa's unofficial anthem".

One of his biggest achievements as a musician was playing in front of Nelson Mandela at his inauguration in 1994.

After moving to Los Angeles, Lazar became involved in writing and composing music for a number of American TV shows. This began in 1995. He went on to write music for the final episodes of Sex and the City, and score An American Crime, starring Elliot Page and James Francho, and for which Catherine Keener was nominated for an Emmy. Lazar received an award for the best score from Film Music Magazine for his score for the film, Gangster's Paradise: Jerusalema. During the same year, National Geographic's Swamp of the Baboons was nominated for a production Emmy, with Lazar responsible for all of the music production.

From 2010, he scored The Real Housewives of Beverly Hills and from 2012 its sister show, The Real Housewives of Orange County. In 2011, Lazar published his first novel, ROAM. The book was published by Atria Books.

ROAM
The story of ROAM is about a dog named Nelson, a bright-eyed, inquisitive half-beagle, half-poodle. Nelson loses his owners after following his nose and becoming lost. The story follows Nelson through his years of searching for his owner, Katey, along with all the scenarios he faces in-between.

The book received mainly positive reviews following its release. In 2015, it had a rating of 3.7 out of 5 on GoodReads. The book also went on to finish runner up for the Los Angeles Book Festival Best Fiction award.

References

External links
 
 
 

21st-century American composers
1967 births
Living people
People from Johannesburg
University of the Witwatersrand alumni
USC School of Cinematic Arts alumni
Writers from Los Angeles